Lewis's mabuya  (Eutropis lewisi) is a species of skink found in Indonesia.

References

Eutropis
Reptiles described in 1895
Reptiles of Indonesia
Endemic fauna of Indonesia